Mohammed VI Polytechnic University (French: Université Mohammed VI Polytechnique, commonly abbreviated as UM6P) is a Moroccan non-profit private research university. Its main campus is located in Ben Guerir, near Marrakech, with branches in Rabat and Laayoune. The university is an institution oriented towards applied research and innovation and is engaged in economic and human development, with a focus on African development.

The university hosted its first cohort of students in 2013 before being officially inaugurated on January 12, 2017. Since then, the university has continued to expand to become a leading research institution for collaborations between Africa and Europe. UM6P also hosts the most powerful supercomputer in Africa. The UM6P federates a number of schools and research institutes, some of which predate the existence of the university. The university has numerous international partnerships with universities around the globe, including the Massachusetts Institute of Technology, Columbia Business School, Max Planck Society, HEC Paris, Mines ParisTech, the École Polytechnique Fédérale de Lausanne, McGill University, and Sciences Po. It was originally established by the charitable foundation of the state-owned OCP Group. It prioritises research and innovation relevant to Morocco and Africa by focusing on topics such as industrialization, food security, sustainable development, mining, behavioural and social sciences. An associated Institute of Advanced Studies that will house visiting scientists from all around the world is being created.

History 

The university emerged as part of the "Green City" project, a major urban development project located just outside the historical city of Ben Guerir with the aim of creating a model city of sustainability, with a special interest in promoting research, education and development in Africa. In 2012, the construction of the university was launched and began operating one year later, in 2013. Over the course of the following years, numerous Schools and research centres were founded or integrated into the university.

In 2017, the National Commission for the Coordination of Higher Education (CNCES) ruled favorably on the recognition of the UM6P by the Moroccan state. It is since then fully accredited, its diplomas recognised, and the university was deemed to meet quality standard in terms of infrastructure and equipment as well as academic programs and research.

Organisation 

The university is currently organised around three major research clusters which are composed of a number of semi-autonomous schools:

 Science and Technology:
 School of Industrial Management
 School of Computer Science
 MSDA
 Green Tech Institute
 Institute of Biological Sciences
 Institute of Science, Technology & Innovation
 School of Agriculture, Fertilizers & Environmental Sciences
 School of Architecture, Planning & Design
 Humanities, Economics and Social Sciences:
 Faculty of Governance, Economic and Social Sciences
 Business:
 Africa Business School
 School of Collective Intelligence
 School of Hospitality Business & Management

International partnerships 

The UM6P has built a national and international network of partnerships with higher education institutions, research centers, organizations and companies. UM6P partner institutions are, amongst other countries, located in Morocco, the United States, Austria, France, Switzerland, Canada, China, Brazil, Malaysia, Germany, Spain, Australia, Finland, United Kingdom, Netherlands, Ivory Coast.

Research 

The UM6P's mission and research focus is strongly focused on advancing research and innovation as well as promoting development in Africa. It collaborates with several institutions in African countries and has set up experimental research platforms and applied research laboratories with partner universities across the continent. Among UM6P's prominent research laboratories is MSDA. MSDA stands for Modeling, Simulation and Data Analysis and specializes in mathematical and phenomenological modeling, numerical simulation and data analysis.

Campus 

Both UM6P campuses in Benguerir and Rabat have been designed by Ricardo Bofill Taller de Arquitectura with Moroccan architect Elie Mouyal, creators of the Casablanca Twin Center. They combine modern and traditional Moroccan elements. The former is also strongly integrated into the "Green City" urban transformation project that aims to make Benguerir model of sustainable development. It offers on-campus student accommodation. The campus near Rabat is adjacent to the  business park.

References

External links

 

Liberal arts colleges
Universities in Morocco
Schools in Rabat
Mohammed VI of Morocco
2013 establishments in Africa